Natasha Tonya Henstridge (born August 15, 1974) is a Canadian actress and model. In 1995, she came to prominence with her debut role in the science-fiction thriller Species, followed by performances in Species II and Species III. She has since starred in a string of films and television series, including Maximum Risk (1996), The Whole Nine Yards (2000), The Whole Ten Yards (2004), Ghosts of Mars (2001), She Spies (2002–2004), Eli Stone (2008–2009), and Would Be Kings (2008). For the latter, she won the Gemini Award for Best Actress. From 2019-2022, she starred in the CBC Television/BET+ drama series Diggstown.

Early life
Henstridge was born in Springdale, Newfoundland and Labrador, on August 15, 1974, to Helen Henstridge, a homemaker, and Brian Henstridge, a construction-manager and business-owner. She was raised in Fort McMurray, Alberta, with her younger brother, Shane.

Career

Modeling
At age 14, Henstridge entered the Casablanca Modeling Agency's Look of the Year contest and was chosen first runner-up. The following year, she went to Paris to pursue her modeling ambitions. At age 15, she was featured on her first magazine cover, the French edition of Cosmopolitan. Several more magazine covers followed and Henstridge went on to do television commercials for products such as Olay, Old Spice and Lady Stetson. With her modeling career established, Henstridge started doing commercials and decided she preferred acting. One of her first roles was as “Foxy Fox” in the Missoula Children's Theatre production of “Snow White and the Seven Dwarfs” staged in Fort McMurray, Alberta.

Film
In her film debut Species (1995), Henstridge played Sil, a genetically engineered alien/human hybrid created from a message received by SETI, who breaks free from the captivity of a laboratory. Pursued by a team of experts who band together to stop her before she reproduces, Sil embarks on a killing spree while also discovering her powerful instinct to mate. Species was an instant hit, making US$113 million at the box office. Notable for its sexual content, the film won Henstridge the MTV Movie Award for Best Kiss for a scene in which her character, while kissing a date, impales his head with her tongue. In 1998, she played Eve, a more ambiguous genetic duplicate of Sil, in Species II, which was a failure at the box office. Between Species films, Henstridge starred in two low budget action films in 1996, Adrenalin: Fear the Rush with Christopher Lambert, and  Maximum Risk opposite Jean-Claude Van Damme.

A few smaller independent movies followed, including Bela Donna and Dog Park, with varied box office returns. Henstridge starred in the film The Whole Nine Yards (2000) and its sequel The Whole Ten Yards (2004). Despite having some reservations about the science fiction genre, she signed up for John Carpenter's Ghosts of Mars (2001) in the lead role of Lieutenant Melanie Ballard. The film was not well received, with a 20% rating on Rotten Tomatoes. In 2004, she briefly appeared as Eve in Species III.

In 2007, Henstridge was a festival judge at the first annual Noor Iranian Film Festival.

Television
Henstridge has played a number of roles on television, for example in Caracara and The Outer Limits. From 2005 to 2006, she had a recurring role as the Speaker's Chief of Staff on the ABC drama Commander in Chief, which starred Geena Davis as a fictional female U.S. president. She also hosted Mostly True Stories: Urban Legends Revealed on TLC, a show about urban legends. She guest-starred as a substitute teacher in the first-season South Park episode "Tom's Rhinoplasty", and was credited as "the chick from Species".

Henstridge was working on the television series She Spies, prior to its cancellation. She has also completed a television movie for the Lifetime channel titled Widow on the Hill. In 2006, she filmed the CTV original miniseries Would Be Kings in Hamilton, Ontario, for which she won a Gemini Award. She also starred in the expansion set to the video game Command and Conquer 3: Tiberium Wars, entitled Kane's Wrath.

In 2008, Henstridge played a role on the ABC comedy-drama series Eli Stone. She has also been involved with two other productions, joining the cast of Dave Rodriguez's Anytown, an indie drama that examines a racist high school attack and its aftermath. She has also been involved with the production of Should've Been Romeo from American Independent Pictures.

In 2009, Henstridge did a guest spot on The Tonight Show with Conan O'Brien. During this, she demonstrated a Newfoundland custom called "Screeching In" which involved getting O'Brien to drink Newfoundland Screech rum and kiss a large fish.

In 2011, she appeared on the season 9 finale and season 10 premiere of CSI: Miami as Renee Locklear. She then starred in the CW television series The Secret Circle as Dawn Chamberlain.

From 2019-2022, she starred in the CBC Television/BET+ drama series Diggstown.

Personal life
Henstridge married American actor Damian Chapa in 1995 and they divorced in 1996. She dated American actor Liam Waite from 1996 to 2004, and they have two sons together: Tristan River (born October 1998) and Asher Sky (born September 2001). She began a relationship with late Scottish singer Darius Campbell in 2004. They became engaged but broke it off in early 2010, then married on Valentine's Day 2011. They filed for divorce in July 2013. The divorce was finalized in February 2018.

In June 2009, Henstridge spoke of her past use of diet pills in combination with extreme diets for weight loss; she said this damaged her metabolism and led to subsequent weight gain.

In November 2017, during the height of the #MeToo movement, Henstridge joined six other actresses in accusing director Brett Ratner of sexual assault and harassment; she maintains that he forced her to perform oral sex on him in the early 1990s. She also accused producer Harvey Weinstein of sexual harassment.

Filmography

Film

Television

References

External links

 
 
 

1974 births
20th-century Canadian actresses
21st-century Canadian actresses
Actresses from Alberta
Actresses from Newfoundland and Labrador
Canadian female models
Canadian film actresses
Canadian Screen Award winners
Canadian stage actresses
Canadian television actresses
Living people
People from Fort McMurray
People from Newfoundland (island)